Mark Thomas Stoops (born July 9, 1967) is an American college football coach and former player. He is the head football coach the University of Kentucky, a position he has held since the 2013 season. Stoops all-time winningest head coach in the history of the Kentucky Wildcats football program.

Early life
Stoops, one of six children born to Ron and Evelyn "Dee Dee" Stoops, attended Cardinal Mooney High School in Youngstown, Ohio, where his father was an assistant coach and defensive coordinator. He is the brother of former Oklahoma head coach Bob Stoops and former Arizona head coach Mike Stoops.

After graduating from high school, Stoops played college football for the Iowa Hawkeyes from 1986 to 1988.

Coaching career
Stoops was a graduate assistant coach at Iowa from 1989 to 1991, and then became the athletic director and defensive backs coach at Nordonia High School in Macedonia, Ohio (1992–1995).

In 1996, when Kansas State assistant Jim Leavitt was hired as the head coach for the South Florida Bulls, he hired Stoops as defensive backs coach.

Stoops served as the defensive backs coach for the University of Wyoming Cowboys from 1997–1999.

At Wyoming, Stoops served under head coach Dana Dimel. When Dimel was hired at the University of Houston, he took Stoops with him to join the Cougars as co-defensive coordinator (along with Dick Bumpas) and safeties coach in 2000.

Miami (FL)
In February 2001, Stoops was named the defensive backs coach for the University of Miami Hurricanes, replacing Chuck Pagano, who left to go to the Cleveland Browns.

Arizona
Mark's brother, Mike, was hired as the head coach of the Arizona Wildcats for the 2004 season. Mike then hired Mark as part of his staff.

Florida State
On December 11, 2009, Stoops accepted the job as defensive coordinator at Florida State University.

Kentucky
On November 27, 2012, Stoops was hired as the new head coach of the University of Kentucky football program, replacing former head coach Joker Phillips, who was fired after a 2–10 season. In Stoops' first season as the Kentucky Head coach, he went 2-10, followed by back to back 5-7 seasons.

After an 0–2 start to the 2016 season, Stoops led the Wildcats to a 7–6 finish after that start and defeated their in-state rival, the eleventh-ranked Louisville Cardinals. They lost in the Taxslayer Bowl to Georgia Tech.

The 2017 season featured ups and downs and the breakout of star running back Benny Snell. They finished 7-5, losing afterwards in the Music City Bowl to Northwestern.

The 2018 season was a historic one for the Wildcats. Paced by Snell on offense and Josh Allen on defense, they snapped a 31-year losing streak to Florida, finishing 9-3–only the fourth time in school history that the Wildcats have won at least nine games. Kentucky defeated Penn State in the Citrus Bowl on January, 1st, 2019 giving the Wildcats their first 10-win season since 1977, and only their third in school history. Stoops was named SEC Coach of the Year, the first time a Kentucky coach had won the award since Jerry Claiborne in 1983.

The 2019 season was one of overcoming adversity. After a 2-3 start in which they lost all of their Quarterbacks to injury, Kentucky turned to Wide Receiver Lynn Bowden Jr. to take over at QB. With a revamped offense focused on the running game, the Wildcats finished the Regular Season 7-5 routing Louisville 45-13 on Senior Day. Kentucky capped the season with a thrilling win over Virginia Tech in the Belk Bowl, as the Wildcats scored the winning touchdown with 15 seconds remaining for an 8-5 finish.

The 2020 season, affected by the COVID-19 pandemic, saw Kentucky play a 10-game, All-SEC regular-season schedule. The high point was a 34-7 win at Tennessee their first win in Knoxville since 1984. Despite a 4-6 record, Kentucky was still invited to a bowl game, specifically the 2021 Gator Bowl against No. 24 NC State. Stoops led Kentucky to victory in the Gator Bowl 23-21, making it three straight bowl victories for the team.

The 2021 season was marked by key transfer arrivals for both sides of the ball: QB Will Levis and WR Wan'Dale Robinson on offense and LB Jacquez Jones on defense. The aforementioned players' impact was significant; the offense scored 33.3 points per game while the defense allowed 22.1 points per game. The improved play from both offense and defense led to a 9-3 regular-season record, including a 20-13 home win against Florida. Stoops lead Kentucky to a 20-17 victory over Iowa in the 2022 Citrus Bowl, giving the team its 2nd 10-3 record since 2018, 2nd Citrus Bowl victory in four years and fourth straight bowl victory. 

The 2022 season marked Stoops' 10th season as head coach, becoming the football program's longest-tenured head coach in its history. Kentucky's Week 1 37-13 victory over Miami (OH) gave Stoops his 60th victory as head coach, tying Bear Bryant for the most in program history. He became Kentucky's all-time winningest football coach after beating the Florida Gators on the road 26-16 in Week 2. Kentucky struggled through the season, finishing with a 7-5 record. Kentucky was invited to the 2023 Music City Bowl, playing against Iowa for the 2nd straight year. With starting QB Levis sitting out of the bowl game, Kentucky were shut out by Iowa 21-0. The shutout loss ended Kentucky's streak of bowl victories at four.

Stoops signed a contract extension on November 18, 2022 that will keep him in Lexington through the 2030 season. He is 66-59 in 10 seasons leading the Wildcats.

Personal life
Stoops is the younger brother of former Oklahoma head coach Bob Stoops, former Arizona head coach and current Kentucky assistant Mike Stoops, and Ron, Jr., the oldest of the brothers, who was an assistant coach at Youngstown State. Stoops and his wife Chantel have two sons, Will and Zach. On January 4, 2021, the couple announced that they will be divorcing.

Head coaching record

References

External links
 Kentucky profile

1967 births
Living people
American football defensive backs
Arizona Wildcats football coaches
Florida State Seminoles football coaches
Houston Cougars football coaches
Iowa Hawkeyes football coaches
Iowa Hawkeyes football players
Kentucky Wildcats football coaches
Miami Hurricanes football coaches
South Florida Bulls football coaches
Wyoming Cowboys football coaches
High school football coaches in Ohio
Coaches of American football from Ohio
Players of American football from Youngstown, Ohio